CCNA (Cisco Certified Network Associate) is an information technology (IT) certification from Cisco Systems. CCNA certification is an associate-level Cisco Career certification.

The Cisco exams have changed several times in response to changing IT trends. In 2020, Cisco announced an update to its certification program that "Consolidated and updated associate level training and certification." Cisco has consolidated the previous different types of Cisco-Certified Network Associate with a general CCNA certification. 

The content of the exams is proprietary. Cisco and its learning partners offer a variety of different training methods, including books published by Cisco Press, and online and classroom courses available under the title "Interconnecting Cisco Network Devices".

Exam 
To achieve a CCNA certification, candidates must earn a passing score on Cisco exam No. 200-301. At the completion of the exam, candidates receive a score report along with a score breakdown by exam section and the passing score for the given exam. 

The exam tests a candidate's knowledge and skills required to install, operate, and troubleshoot a small to medium size enterprise branch network. The exam covers a broad range of fundamentals, including network fundamentals, network access, IP connectivity, IP services, security fundamentals, automation and programmability.

Prerequisites
There are no prerequisites to take the CCNA certification exam. There is also a starting point of networking which is the CCT (Cisco Certified Technician).

Validity
The validity of CCNA Certification is three years. Renewal requires certification holders to register for and pass the same or higher level Cisco re-certification exam(s) every three years.

See also

Cisco certifications
DevNet
Cyber Ops
CCNP
CCIE Certification

References
 Cisco CCNA 200-301 Online Course UK". Distance Learning Guide

External links 

 CCNA Certification
 CCNA Course

Career Certifications
Information technology qualifications
Computer security qualifications